Fairground most typically refers to a permanent space that hosts fairs.

Fairground, Fairgrounds, Fair Ground or Fair Grounds may also refer to:

Places

Canada
 Fairground, Ontario, a community

United States
 Fairground, St. Louis, a neighborhood of St. Louis, Missouri
 Fairground Park, a municipal park in St. Louis, Missouri
 Fairgrounds, New Orleans, a city neighborhood
 Fairgrounds Park, a park in Hagerstown, Maryland
 Fairgrounds Field, a ballpark in Robstown, Texas
 Fairgrounds Speedway, an independent racetrack near Nashville, Tennessee
 Fair Grounds Race Course, a thoroughbred racetrack and casino in New Orleans

Music
 Fair Ground (band), a Canadian alternative rock band

Songs
 "Fairground" (Simply Red song)
 "Fairground", by James from the album Strip-mine

Other uses
 Fair territory, the main area of a baseball field
Fairground Gaming, an online gaming company
 Fair Grounds (organization), a UK-based Fair Trade social enterprise

See also
 Fair green (disambiguation)